Zarandin may refer to:
 Zarandin-e Olya
 Zarandin-e Sofla